Alon Alexander Abelski (born 29 May 1989) is a German footballer who plays for Sportfreunde Baumberg.

Biography

Playing career 
Abelski made his full debut on 17 January 2010 in a 2. Bundesliga match against FSV Frankfurt.

After being released by Arminia Bielefeld in 2011, Abelski joined Hapoel Tel Aviv on trial. Abelski holds Israel citizenship.

He played for Team Germany in Israel at the 2017 Maccabiah Games.

References

External links 
 
 
Alon Abelski on Fupa

1989 births
Living people
20th-century German Jews
Jewish footballers
German footballers
Association football midfielders
MSV Duisburg players
Arminia Bielefeld players
SV Eintracht Trier 05 players
SpVgg Unterhaching players
2. Bundesliga players
3. Liga players
Maccabiah Games competitors
Maccabiah Games competitors for Germany
Maccabiah Games footballers
Competitors at the 2017 Maccabiah Games

Footballers from Düsseldorf